Jason Ramsey (born 24 January 1975) is a former Australian rules footballer who played for Fitzroy in the Australian Football League (AFL) in 1996. He was recruited from the Port Adelaide Football Club (SANFL) in the South Australian National Football League  (SANFL) with the 4th selection in the 1995 Pre-season Draft.  

Despite being elevated to Richmond's senior list in 1997, he did not play a senior game for Richmond. He missed the entire 1998 season due to a dislocated shoulder and was delisted at the end of the 1999 season.

References

External links

Living people
1975 births
Fitzroy Football Club players
Port Adelaide Football Club (SANFL) players
Port Adelaide Football Club players (all competitions)
Australian rules footballers from South Australia